Ebbets is a surname. Notable people with the surname include:

Charles Ebbets (1859–1925), American sports executive
Charles C. Ebbets (1905–1978), American photographer
William H. Ebbets (1825–1890), American politician
John Ebbetts (or Ebbets), namesake of Ebbetts Pass

See also
Ebbets Field, a former baseball park in Brooklyn, New York
Ebbett, a similar surname